Josep Piqué i Camps (born 21 February 1955 in Vilanova i la Geltrú) is a Spanish politician of the right-leaning Spanish People's Party (PP) who represented Barcelona. Pique was initially a member of the Unified Socialist Party of Catalonia (PSUC) but left the grouping and subsequently joined the Union of the Democratic Centre.

Political career
Between 1986 and 1988, Piqué served as Director General of Industry under the Convergence and Union government of Catalonia.

After the People's Party election in 1996, Piqué was appointed Spanish Minister for Industry as an independent member. He served as Spain's foreign minister from 2000 to 2002. In this capacity, he steered Spain’s foreign policy during its six-month presidency of the Council of the European Union. As part of a cabinet reshuffle, he was replaced by Ana de Palacio y del Valle-Lersundi and instead took over the Ministry of Science and Technology, which oversees the telecommunications industry. At the time, he was thought to have paid the price for failing to resolve the protracted dispute with the UK over the future of Gibraltar.

Piqué was the president of the Partit Popular de Catalunya from October 2002. He resigned from this position in July 2007 after disagreement over the political direction that the central PP (Partido Popular, People's Party) wanted to impose over the Catalan branch of the party. After serving in the Spanish Congress from 2000 he resigned in 2003 after being elected to the Parliament of Catalonia.

Life after politics
Between November 2007 and 2013, Piqué served as chairman of low-cost carrier Vueling Airlines.

In November 2008, Piqué was co-chair of the Global China Business Meeting 2008 in Madrid. From November 2008 until June 2009, Piqué served as member of a six-member panel of EU experts advising the Bulgarian government. Set up by Bulgaria's Prime Minister Sergei Stanishev, the advisory board was chaired by Dominique de Villepin and mandated to recommend ways to help the country adjust to EU membership. In addition, Piqué serves on the Political Sponsorship Committee of the Institut de Prospective Economique du Monde Méditerranéen (IPEMED).

In 2009 he launched PANGEA21 Consultora Internacional, a small firm in Barcelona to provide consulting services and management advice in all kinds of international business.

He was appointed member of the Board of Directors of Amadeus IT Group in June 2019.

References

 "Missing the Barcelona bourgeoisie", Josep Piqué, Barcelona Metropolis, 2008.

|-

|-

1955 births
Living people
People from Vilanova i la Geltrú
Industry ministers of Spain
Foreign ministers of Spain
Members of the Parliament of Catalonia
Members of the 7th Congress of Deputies (Spain)
People's Party (Spain) politicians
Directors of Abengoa
Directors of Amadeus IT Group